Jive Jive is the tenth album and the eighth studio album by Casiopea, recorded and released in 1983.

Track listing

Personnel
CASIOPEA are
Issei Noro - Electric guitar (YAMAHA SG Original, SG 3000, GS-1000 Fretless), KORG Guitar Synthesizer, Linn Drum Computer, Percussion, Vocal (A3)
Minoru Mukaiya - Keyboards (YAMAHA GS-1, DX-3, CS-70M, Emulator, ROLAND Jupiter 6, Acoustic Piano)
Tetsuo Sakurai - Electric Bass (YAMAHA BB-2000 Milk Bass, Kramer OMZ-6000B)
Akira Jimbo - Drums (YAMAHA YD-9000 RG, Simmons V), Linn Drum Computer, Amdeck Percussion Synthesizer
Ki-Ki Dee - Vocal (B4)
Mae Mckenna - Vocal (A3, B1, B2)
Jackie Challenok - Vocal (B1, B2)
Lorenza Johnson - Vocal (B1, B2)
Guy Barker - Trumpet
Stuart Brooks - Trumpet
Phill Todo - Sax
Pete Beachill - Trombone
Richard Niles - Brass arrangement (B1)
Drachen Theaker - Tabla (A5)

Production
Executive Producer - Kunihiko Murai
Assistant Executive Producer - Edward Leaman
Engineer - Richard Manwaring
Assistant Engineer - Steve Travell
Mastering - Gordon Vicary
A&R Director - Shunsuke Miyazumi
Art Director - Kaoru Watanabe
Cover Designers - Kaoru Watanabe, Hiroyasu Yoshioka, Katsunori Hironaka
Cover drawing - Issei Noro
Remastering engineer - Kouji Suzuki (2016)

Release history

External links

References

1983 albums
Casiopea albums
Alfa Records albums